Karen Hawkins (born Tennessee) is a best-selling American author of sixteen historical  romance novels.  Her novels are known for their humor.

Biography
Hawkins was raised in Tennessee, where she lived with her parents, biological brother and sister, an adopted sister, numerous foster siblings and a number of foreign exchange students.  It was not uncommon for 12-15 children to be living in the house at any one time.

Hawkins has a Ph.D. in political science, and spent time teaching political science at a small college in Georgia. She studied writing by joining the Romance Writers of America and attending their workshops and conferences.  Before she was published, she won RWA chapter and national contests for her work, allowing her to gain feedback and critiques from actual editors.  With this feedback, she refined her craft, and sold her first book in 1998.  She now publishes two books a year.   Hawkins was also the driving force behind the two Lady Whistledown anthologies, developing the idea, gaining a publisher, and organizing the intertwined parts of the books. She also has a beautiful son and daughter who inspire her to write and for whom she enjoys making sandwiches.

Awards
2003 - Romance Writers of America Favorite Book of the Year, Confessions of a Scoundrel
2003 - The Romance Writers of America RITA Award finalist for Confessions of a Scoundrel
The Romance Writers of America RITA Award finalist for her novella from the first Lady Whistledown
New York Times Bestseller's List, various books
USA Today Bestseller's List, various books

Bibliography

Abduction & Seduction Series
The Abduction of Julia (2000)
A Belated Bride (2001)
The Seduction of Sara (2001)

Talisman Ring Series
An Affair to Remember (2002)
Confessions of a Scoundrel (2003)
How to Treat a Lady (2003)
And the Bride Wore Plaid (2004)
Lady in Red (2005)

Ask Reeves Series
Her Master and Commander (2006)
Her Officer and Gentleman (2006)

MacLean Curse Series
How to Abduct a Highland Lord (2007)
To Scotland, With Love (2007)
To Catch a Highlander (2008)
Sleepless In Scotland (2009)
The Laird Who Loved Me (2009)

Prequel to the MacLean Curse series and The Hurst Amulet series
Much Ado About Marriage (August, 2010)

Hurst Amulet Series
One Night in Scotland (Nov, 2010)
Scandal in Scotland (May, 2011)
A Most Dangerous Profession (October, 2011)
The Taming of a Scottish Princess (May, 2012)

Duchess Diaries Series
How to Capture a Countess (September, 2012)
How to Pursue a Princess (May, 2013)
How to Entice an Enchantress (September, 2013)
Princess in Disguise (e-novella) (February, 2013)

The Wicked Widows Short Stories (E-book only)
The Lady in the Tower (December, 2013)
The Lucky One (December, 2013)

The Princes of Oxenburg
Mad for Plaid
The Princess Who Wore Plaid
The Prince Who Loved Me (September, 2014)
Prince and I

Contemporary
Talk of the Town (2008)
Lois Lane Tells All (2010)

Single Novels
Catherine and the Pirate (2002)

Anthologies
The Further Observations of Lady Whistledown (2003) with Suzanne Enoch, Julia Quinn and Mia Ryan.
Lady Whistledown Strikes Back (2004) with Suzanne Enoch, Julia Quinn and Mia Ryan.

External links
 Karen Hawkins Official Website

American romantic fiction writers
Living people
Year of birth missing (living people)